Aleksandr Vladimirovich Ugarov (born 8 June 1982) is a former Russian professional football player.

External links
 Career summary by sportbox.ru
 

1982 births
Sportspeople from Kaluga
Living people
Russian footballers
Association football defenders
FC Dynamo Moscow reserves players
FC Zhetysu players
Kazakhstan Premier League players
Russian expatriate footballers
Expatriate footballers in Kazakhstan